In physical science and mathematics, the Legendre functions ,  and associated Legendre functions , , and Legendre functions of the second kind, are all solutions of Legendre's differential equation. The Legendre polynomials and the associated Legendre polynomials are also solutions of the differential equation in special cases, which, by virtue of being polynomials, have a large number of additional properties, mathematical structure, and applications. For these polynomial solutions, see the separate Wikipedia articles.

Legendre's differential equation 
The general Legendre equation reads

where the numbers  and  may be complex, and are called the degree and order of the relevant function, respectively.
If , the superscript is omitted, and one writes just , . However, the solution  when  is an integer is often discussed separately as Legendre's function of the second kind, and denoted .

Like all such equations, it can be converted into a hypergeometric differential equation by a change of variable, and its solutions can be expressed using hypergeometric functions.

Solutions of the differential equation 
Since the differential equation is linear, homogeneous (the right hand side =zero) and of second order, it has two linearly independent solutions, which can both be expressed in terms of the hypergeometric function, . With  being the gamma function, the first solution is

and the second is,

These are generally known as Legendre functions of the first and second kind of noninteger degree, with the additional qualifier 'associated' if  is non-zero.

Positive integer order 

with  the (rising) Pochhammer symbol.

Legendre functions of the second kind

It is given by

This solution is necessarily singular when .

The Legendre functions of the second kind can also be defined recursively via Bonnet's recursion formula

Associated Legendre functions of the second kind 

Integral representations
The Legendre functions can be written as contour integrals. For example,

For real , we have

Legendre function as characters

where

See also 
 Ferrers function

References

 
 .

External links
Legendre function P on the Wolfram functions site.
Legendre function Q on the Wolfram functions site.
Associated Legendre function P on the Wolfram functions site.
Associated Legendre function Q on the Wolfram functions site.

Hypergeometric functions